(born 1960 in Shimane Prefecture, Japan), sometimes spelled as TOBI Hirotaka, is a Japanese science fiction writer.

History
Tobi debuted by "Polyphonic Illusion" (1981) which was the winner of Sanseido SF Story Contest.
After a handful of short stories published during 1980s, he was absent from SF publishing scene for a decade.

In 2002 he returned with Grande Vacance, which was nominated to Nihon SF Taisho Award, and his collection Katadorareta chikara earned the award in 2005.  He received the Nihon SF Taisho Award again in 2017 for a short-stories collection Jisei no yume, which was the first time the same person to receive the award twice, after its regulation was changed from its initial awarding of the lifetime achievements.

Awards

 2005: Seiun Award Best Japanese Short Story for "Katadorareta chikara"
 2005: Nihon SF Taisho Award for Katadorareta chikara
 2006: Sense of Gender Award for ラギッド・ガール―廃園の天使〈2〉 [The Ragged-Skin Girl: Angel in the Deserted Garden 2]
 2010: Seiun Award Best Japanese Short Story for "Jisei no yume"
 2015: Seiun Award Best Japanese Short Story for "Umi no yubi"
 2017: Nihon SF Taisho Award for Jisei no yume
 2019: Seiun Award Best Japanese Long Story for

Works

 Grande Vacance (2002) —First book of the Angel of the Ruins series.
 Katadorareta chikara (2004) —Collection of early short stories.
 Ragged Girl  (2006) —Collection of short stories. Second book of the Angel of the Ruins series.
 Jisei no yume (2016) —Collection of short stories.
 Polyphonic Illusion (2018) —Collection of essays and early short stories.
 Reigōkin (2018)

English translations, long form

 Thousand Year Beach (2018), translation of Grande Vacance (2002)

English translations, short form

 "Autogenic Dreaming: Interview with the Columns of Clouds" (2012), translation of "Jisei no yume" (2009)
 "Sea Fingers" (2016), translation of "Umi no yubi" (2014)

Notes

External links
題材不新鮮 SF作家 飛浩隆のweb録  
 

1960 births
People from Shimane Prefecture
Writers from Shimane Prefecture
Japanese science fiction writers
Living people